A clothes shop or clothes store is any shop which sells items of ready-made clothing. A small shop which sells expensive or designer clothing may be called a boutique. A shop that sells clothes for a narrowlyrestricted market such as school uniforms or outdoor sports may be called an outfitter.

History 
It is not known when the first clothes shops were opened in Europe. Before the era of ready-made clothes, when clothing was made by tailors or artisans, shops may have sold second-hand clothing. Some ready-made clothes may have been made in the sixteenth century. The number of clothes shops appears to have risen steadily long before the beginning of large-scale industrial manufacture of clothing in the second half of the nineteenth century.

References

Clothing retailers
Sales occupations
Retailers by type of merchandise sold